The Salober ist a  grass mountain in the Allgäu Alps. It lies northeast of the Laufbacher Eck.

Its name probably means  "healthy, smart, attractive" (also used of scenery).

There are no signed paths to the top of the Salober. It can be accessed from the Feldalpe across trackless terrain. This climb requires a head for heights and sure-footedness. Occasionally the Salober is climbed as part of a crossing of the whole chain from the Giebel via the Berggächtle to the Laufbacher Eck by experienced mountaineers (Climbing grade: UIAA III).

The botany of the Salober is as rich as that of the other Allgäu grass mountains.

References 
 Zettler, Groth: Alpenvereinsführer Allgäuer Alpen. Bergverlag Rudolf Rother, München 1984. , S. o.A.

Mountains of Bavaria
Mountains of the Alps
Allgäu Alps
Oberallgäu
Two-thousanders of Germany